Deltron 3030 is an alternative hip hop trio composed of producer Dan the Automator (as the Cantankerous Captain Aptos), rapper Del the Funky Homosapien (as Deltron Zero/Deltron Osiris), and DJ Kid Koala (as Skiznod the Boy Wonder). They also collaborate with a variety of other musicians under many futuristic pseudonyms.

History

Deltron 3030

The group's debut album Deltron 3030, released on May 23, 2000, is a concept album set in the year 3030 that tells of the dualistic conflict of fatalism that takes place between the moral concepts of "righteousness" and "malevolence." The story tells a prophetic tale of a warrior's thirst for battle as Del's alter ego, who goes by the name "Deltron-Zero," along with his comrade who happens to be a time-traveling cyborg wizard named "the Automator," face-off against megalithic corporations that megalomaniacally rule over our thermodynamic universe. The lyrics were written in less than two weeks and are characterized by extravagant allusions to futuristic outer-space themes in the tradition of Afrofuturist works by Sun Ra and George Clinton. Many samples originated with the contemporary French classical  composer William Sheller.

Event 2

Deltron 3030's second album, titled Event 2, was released in September, 2013.

Production began as far back as 2004, and in November 2006 Del told IGN that four songs were already written and that "the album's lyrical theme has been basically mapped out." Dan the Automator stated that the recording of the new album would probably be completed by December 2006, and that it would be released in 2007. Due to a series of delays, group members issued a number of statements predicting imminent completion in 2008, 2010, 2011, and 2012.

On June 11, 2012, Deltron 3030 performed at the Luminato festival in Toronto, Ontario, a show that Kid Koala dubbed the Deltron Event 2 World Premiere. The group played with a full horn, strings, and rhythm section conducted by Dan the Automator, premiered ten songs from Event 2, and revealed the visual style of the new album. In accordance with Del's statement that "3030 actually was one event, but these events can span centuries." The first single from the album was "City Rising From the Ashes," a song influenced by the story of Osiris. On September 23, 2013, Event 2 was put on Pitchfork's Advance Streaming service in its entirety, one week before its official release.

In October 2016, an expanded edition of Event 2 was released, featuring instrumentals from the album. Alongside this new addition, a live album featuring Deltron 3030, many of their collaborators from the Event 2 album, and the 3030 Orchestra, simply entitled Live, was released.

Upcoming third album 
On an episode of Red Bull Radio Peak Time in 2018, Dan The Automator confirmed he was working on a new Deltron 3030 album, stating "there's a couple songs that exist." He also hinted that Dr. Octagon would have a cameo on the album.

Discography

References

External links
 
 Hieroglyphics.com's Deltron 3030 page
 Video: Deltron Event II Recording Session | The Find Magazine

American hip hop groups
Musical groups from California
Hip hop supergroups
Concept album series
Trip hop groups
Alternative hip hop groups
Musical groups established in 1999
Underground hip hop groups
1999 establishments in California